Kenneth Connor,  (6 June 1918 – 28 November 1993) was a British stage, film and broadcasting actor, who rose to national prominence with his appearances in the Carry On films.

Early life
Connor was born in Highbury, Islington, London, the son of a naval petty officer who organised concert parties. He first appeared on the stage at the age of two as an organ-grinder's monkey in one of his father's shows, in Portsmouth. By the age of 11 he had his own act. He attended the Central School of Speech and Drama, where he was a Gold Medal winner. Connor made his professional debut in J. M. Barrie's The Boy David, at His Majesty's Theatre, London, in December 1936.

During the Second World War he served as an infantry gunner with the Middlesex Regiment, but continued acting by touring Italy and the Middle East with the Stars in Battledress concert party and ENSA. Earlier in the war, in 1941, he was apparently performing as a comedic entertainer in a concert party named the "Tam o Shanter's", as evidenced by a programme from the concert at the Summer Theatre at Felixstowe, dated Saturday 5 July 1941. The full cast autographed the programme, suggesting a final performance for the concert party, with Kenneth signing it "All the best Ken Connor". While waiting to be demobbed in Cairo, Connor received a telegram from William Devlin asking him to join the newly formed Bristol Old Vic, where he gained a solid grounding in the classics.

Career
He moved on to the London Old Vic Company for a 1947–48 season at the New Theatre. His most notable performances there were as Chaplain de Stogumber in Saint Joan and Dobchinsky in The Government Inspector, which starred Alec Guinness. Realising he was not a "tall, impressive juvenile lead or a young lover type", he decided to specialise in comedy. He appeared in Talbot Rothwell's farce Queen Elizabeth Slept Here in the West End in 1949.

He took over from Peter Sellers in Ted Ray's radio show Ray's a Laugh – launched by the BBC in 1949 as a successor to Tommy Handley's ITMA. He played the brother-in-law and other oddball characters such as Sidney Mincing. Ray took Connor with him to his TV shows, and the pair would star together in the third Carry On film, Carry On Teacher.

On occasion, he appeared in The Goon Show, standing in for regular cast members struck down by illness. He also appeared in the anarchic, Goon-style TV series The Idiot Weekly, Price 2d (1956) and A Show Called Fred (1956).

Connor gained a small role in the film The Ladykillers (1955) as a taxi driver. In 1958, he was cast in the first Carry On film, Carry On Sergeant, and became one of the regular cast in the series, appearing in seventeen of the original thirty films and many of the associated television productions. Alongside Kenneth Williams and Eric Barker, Connor was one of only three actors to appear in both the first and last of the original sequence of Carry On films (Carry On Sergeant and Carry On Emmannuelle).

In his earlier Carry On appearances, Connor frequently played the romantic lead or other sympathetic roles (typically with an element of comically neurotic anxiety), while later appearances saw him play less sympathetic characters such as married men with wandering eyes who made lascivious remarks. In Carry On Nurse (1959), his real-life son Jeremy appeared as his character Bernie Bishop's son. In 1961, he starred with fellow Carry On stars Sid James and Esma Cannon in the comedy film What a Carve Up! In fact, in the 1959–61 period, he was one of the most prominent leading men in British comedy films. As well as What a Carve Up! and the Carry On films, other films he starred in during this period included Watch Your Stern (1960), Nearly a Nasty Accident (1961) and the Dentist films. In 1960, he did the voices of the horse and dog in the Four Feather Falls puppet series.

Connor had a good tenor voice, which he occasionally used to good effect, such as in the 1962 movie Carry On Cruising.

In contrast with some of his Carry On co-stars, Connor found further success on the London stage. He starred in the revue One Over The Eight (1962), at the Duke of York's Theatre, the original London West End production with Frankie Howerd of the Stephen Sondheim musical A Funny Thing Happened on the Way to the Forum (1963), as Hysterium – and directed the show when it went on tour – The Four Musketeers (1967), with Harry Secombe at the Theatre Royal, Drury Lane, playing King Louis XIII, and the revue Carry On London (1973) at the Victoria Palace.

Between 1971 and 1973, Connor joined Dad's Army stars Arthur Lowe and Ian Lavender in the BBC radio comedy Parsley Sidings. On television, he appeared in The Black and White Minstrel Show, as Whatsisname Smith in the children's show Rentaghost (1983–84), and as Monsieur Alfonse in 'Allo 'Allo! (1984–1992) and Uncle Sammy Morris in Hi-de-Hi! (1986–88). He also made guest appearances in sitcoms including That's My Boy and You Rang, M'Lord? and he also appeared in the episode "Sense and Senility" of Blackadder the Third in 1987, alongside fellow veteran comic star Hugh Paddick.

In 1991, he was honoured by the Queen with appointment as a Member of the Order of the British Empire (MBE).

He was still working just two days before his death, with an appearance on Noel Edmonds' Telly Addicts. His final TV appearance, as Mr Warren in The Memoirs of Sherlock Holmes episode The Adventure of the Red Circle, was broadcast posthumously in 1994.

Death
Connor died at the age of 75 from the effects of cancer at his home in Harrow in Middlesex on 28 November 1993. His body was cremated at Breakspear Crematorium in Ruislip, Middlesex.

Personal life
He married Margaret Knox ("Miki") during the war in 1942; his son, Jeremy, was a child actor.

Television roles

Selected filmography

References

 4 Summer Theatre, Ranelagh Gardens, Felixstowe - Saturday July 5th 1941

External links

1918 births
1993 deaths
Military personnel from London
20th-century English male actors
Deaths from cancer in England
English male child actors
English male film actors
English male television actors
Members of the Order of the British Empire
Male actors from London
People from Islington (district)
Alumni of the Royal Central School of Speech and Drama
British Army personnel of World War II
Middlesex Regiment soldiers
British male comedy actors